The Washington Community and Technical Colleges system consists of 34 public, two-year institutions of higher education which specialize in vocational, technical, worker retraining, and university transfer programs. Most of the member colleges award associate degrees and certificates, although some also offer specialized bachelor degrees. The largest college of the 34 state-assisted institutions is Bellevue College.

The Washington State Community College system was first established by the Community College Act of 1967.

The Washington State Board for Community and Technical Colleges, along with administering the Community and Technical College Act, provides the member colleges with leadership and information technology services. The board also coordinates, along with the Workforce Training and Education Coordinating Board, the development of educational and workforce training opportunities.

See also
List of colleges and universities in Washington
Running Start

References

External links 
Official website